Frank J. Kimball (November 24, 1846 – March 31, 1927) was an American farmer, businessman, and politician.

Biography
Born in Washington County, New York, Kimball moved to a farm in Columbia County, Wisconsin. In 1872, Kimball moved to Briggsville, Marquette County, Wisconsin. He was in the general merchandise and sewing machine businesses. Kimball served as Douglas, Wisconsin town clerk and notary public. He also served on the school board and was the board clerk. In 1903, 1907, and 1909, Kimball served in the Wisconsin State Assembly and was a Republican. Kimball retired in 1924 and then died at his home in Briggsville, Wisconsin.

References

1846 births
1927 deaths
People from Washington County, New York
People from Briggsville, Wisconsin
Businesspeople from Wisconsin
School board members in Wisconsin
Republican Party members of the Wisconsin State Assembly